The Kirlian Frequency (also known as La Frecuencia Kirlian or Ghost Radio) is an Argentine animated webseries from Argentina released in 2017 on YouTube and Vimeo and, since 15 February 2019, the first five episodes are exclusively available on Netflix. Episodes six through ten are available through the streaming service Flixxo.  The series revolves around a radio that broadcasts only at night, in a small town deep inside Buenos Aires Province where all kinds of macabre and supernatural events occur.

Production 
Production company Tangram Cine developed an indie-funded live-action pilot in 2009. Although it was severely promoted on their social sites, its post-production was never finished and the pilot never saw the light. It was written and directed by Cristian Ponce and Pedro Saieg.

During the next eight years, the series mutated into different forms and was submitted to several development contests, either as a TV series project or as a feature film.

In 2015, its creator, Cristian Ponce decided to go back to the project, but this time as an animated series. Teaming up with Hernán Bengoa (with whom he had worked on two seasons of webseries Policompañeros Motorizados), they gave birth to a new incarnation of the project that was now based in a classic anthological structure, in the style of Twilight Zone or Tales from the Crypt, only tied together by the intervention of its main character, The Host.

The new version was produced by Tangram Cine and Decimu Labs, and was developed almost in its entirety by a four-person crew: Cristian Ponce (screenwriter, director and animator), Hernán Bengoa (screenwriter and illustrator), Hernán Biasotti (sound designer) and Marcelo Cataldo (original soundtrack). It features voice acting by Nicolás Van de Moortele, Casper Uncal, María Duplaá, Letizia Bloisi, Ciro Herce, Milagros Molina and Jorge Alonso.

The series consists of ten episodes, and the first season’s originally released once every three months.

Style 
The Kirlian Frequency takes several elements from classic fantastic films and TV series; for example, the midnight radio trope (The Fog, Night Visions, Pontypool as fiction examples; and Coast to Coast AM and La Mano Peluda in real life); and the small town / big hell trope (Eerie, Indiana, IT, Gravity Falls or Scarfolk).

Netflix 
Halfway through 2018, The Kirlian Frequency virtually disappeared from every video platform and social network. Only at the end of January 2019 was its return announced, this time on Netflix, newly dubbed in English and Portuguese for its international release.

Episodes

Awards 
The Kirlian Frequency won the Best Script (for an animated webseries) award in Bawebfest 2018 Festival.

References

External links 
 Official Website (in Spanish).
 

2010s animated television series
Argentine adult animated horror television series
Animated web series
Spanish-language Netflix original programming